Zelena Dolyna is a village in Kramatorsk Raion of Donetsk Oblast in Ukraine.

The population as of 2021 is 89 people, and the body of local self-government is the Lyman settlement hromada.

History 

During the Russo-Ukrainian War, Russian forces occupied the village from April to September 2022. Ukrainian forces reestablished control over the village during the Second Battle of Lyman.

Demographics 
As of the 2001 Ukrainian Census, the native language distribution of the population is as follows

Ukrainian: 86.9%

Russian: 12.5%

Others: 0.6%

References

External links 

 Weather in Zelena Dolyna

Villages in Kramatorsk Raion